Merry Christmas Creek is a stream in Southeast Fairbanks Census Area, Alaska, in the United States. It is a tributary of Slate Creek.

Prospectors likely coined the name which first appeared on a government map in 1902.

See also
List of rivers of Alaska

References

Rivers of Southeast Fairbanks Census Area, Alaska
Rivers of Alaska
Rivers of Unorganized Borough, Alaska